Arzhang Div (Persian: ارژنگ دیو) is a character in Shahnameh Shahnameh of Shah Tahmasp; he is demon Daeva chief of Mazandaran in Rostam's Seven Labours. Eventually Rostam killed him and rescued Kay Kāvus.

References 

Shahnameh stories
Shahnameh characters
Daevas
Iranian folklore